Eanbald (died  808) was an eighth century Archbishop of York and correspondent of Alcuin.

Life

Eanbald was taught by Alcuin when Alcuin was the teacher of the school of York, and was affectionately nicknamed "Simeon" by Alcuin.

Eanbald was consecrated the successor of his namesake to the archbishopric of York on 14 August 796.

Alcuin wrote frequently to Eanbald, laying down many rules for the direction of his province. He sent many gifts to York, including a shipload of metal (stagnum) for the roof of the bell tower at York Minster.

Eanbald assisted Æthelhard, Archbishop of Canterbury, in recovering the rights of the See of Canterbury which had been despoiled by Offa.

In 798 Eanbald assembled his clergy in synod at Finchale, near Durham. There, he enacted a number of regulations relating to the ecclesiastical courts and the observance of Easter. He may have been the first to introduce the Roman Ritual in the church of York.

Eanbald became estranged from Eardwulf, king of Northumbria after denouncing Eardwulf's adulteries as well as Eanbald's sheltering of Eardwulf's enemies in church sanctuary.

Eanbald died sometime about 808, perhaps as late as 830, if numismatic evidence is correct.

Coinage 
Eanbald, like later archbishops of York, produced coinage in his name.

Notes

Citations

References

External links
 

808 deaths
Archbishops of York
8th-century archbishops
9th-century archbishops
Year of birth unknown